Stephen B. Burbank is the David Berger Professor for the Administration of Justice at the University of Pennsylvania Law School.

Education
Burbank earned an AB from Harvard summa cum laude. He won the Harvard College Honorary Scholarship, the John Harvard Scholarship, the Detur Prize, the Curtis Prize, and the Sheldon Fellowship. In 1970-71, he spent the year in Europe on the Sheldon Fellowship.

He graduated from Harvard Law School magna cum laude in 1973. He received the Newbold Rhinelander Landon Memorial Fellowship, the Joseph H. Beale Prize, and the Fay Diploma (first in class).

Professional career
Burbank was Law Clerk to Justice Robert Braucher of the Massachusetts Supreme Judicial Court in 1973-1974 and to Chief Justice of the United States, Warren Burger, in 1974-1975.

He was general counsel of the University of Pennsylvania from 1975–1980, joining the professorial ranks of Penn Law in 1979.

One of the most influential scholars of federal practice and procedure, Burbank is the author of definitive works on federal court rulemaking, interjurisdictional preclusion, litigation sanctions, and judicial independence and accountability. He is also an authority on international civil litigation and has lectured and taught widely in Europe. He has served as a reporter of judicial discipline rules for the Third Circuit and of that circuit’s task force to study Rule 11, has been invited to testify before congressional committees on numerous occasions and was appointed by the Speaker of the U.S. House of Representatives to serve as a member of the National Commission on Judicial Discipline and Removal (1991–1993).

Burbank served for a decade on the Executive Committee of the American Judicature Society and chaired the Fellowship Selection Committee of the American Academy in Berlin, of which he is now a trustee.

In November 2002, a federal court appointed Burbank special master of the National Football League, until 2011 when he became the league's system arbitrator, a role he has held ever since. In that role, he resolves certain categories of disputes between the NFL Players Association and the NFL Management Council under a consent decree and collective bargaining agreement.

Burbank has been a visiting professor at Harvard; Urbino, Italy; Pavia, Italy; Goethe University, Frankfurt, Germany; and the University of Michigan.

Books
 Rule 11 in Transition: The Report of the Third Circuit Task Force on Federal Rule of Civil Procedure 11 (1989) This multi-method empirical study of the operation of the most controversial procedural rule of the 1980s, cited on numerous occasions by the Supreme Court, was instrumental in bringing about changes in court practices and the rule itself.
 Report of the National Commission on Judicial Discipline and Removal (with others, 1993)
 Judicial Independence at the Crossroads: An Interdisciplinary Approach (with B. Friedman, 2002)

See also 
 List of law clerks of the Supreme Court of the United States (Chief Justice)

References

External links
 Faculty Profile at Penn Law
 CV at Penn Law
 SSRN page

Living people
Law clerks of the Supreme Court of the United States
Harvard Law School alumni
University of Pennsylvania Law School faculty
Year of birth missing (living people)
Scholars of civil procedure law